Metrosideros parkinsonii, also known as Parkinson's rātā or shrubby rata, is a shrub or small tree endemic to New Zealand. The name commemorates Sydney Parkinson, Captain James Cook's botanical artist during his first voyage to New Zealand.

Description
The flowers of M. parkinsonii are usually crimson, and flowering is usually from September until December. Foliage varies from dark green to light green, with leaves usually clasped against the branches. Flowers will often appear directly from branches, and can sometimes be hidden behind the foliage.

Conservation
As of 2012, M. parkinsonii is not regarded as threatened. It naturally occurs in the west coast of the South Island, from Hokitika to Collingwood, as well as Great Barrier and Little Barrier Islands in the Hauraki Gulf.

Cultivation
Metrosideros parkinsonii is a difficult plant to establish. This species is mainly grown for its attractive flowers. Plants may need some pruning and training to achieve a good shape and it can
be grown against walls or fences or as a specimen plant.

It is seldom available through nurseries but is occasionally available from Oratia Native Plant Nursery.

See also
Metrosideros excelsa, Pōhutukawa
Metrosideros robusta, Northern rātā
Metrosideros umbellata, Southern rātā
Metrosideros bartlettii, Bartlett's rātā

References

Further reading
Salmon, J.T., 1986. The Native Trees of New Zealand. Wellington: Heinneman Reed.
Simpson, P., 2005. Pōhutukawa & Rātā: New Zealand's Iron-Hearted Trees. Wellington: Te Papa Press.

parkinsonii
Endemic flora of New Zealand
Trees of New Zealand
Garden plants of New Zealand